Descurainia paradisa is a plant species native to eastern and northern California, southeastern Oregon, Box Elder County in northwestern Utah, and most of Nevada.

Stems are often purple, branching at the base and sometimes above ground. Flowers are pale yellow, borne in a raceme.

References

paradisa
Flora of California
Flora of Nevada
Flora of Oregon
Flora of Utah
Endemic flora of the United States
Taxa named by Aven Nelson
Flora without expected TNC conservation status